Waat is a village in the northeastern part of South Sudan. It is located in Nyirol County, Jonglei State. It is connected by road to Faddoi just to the southeast.

References

Populated places in Jonglei State